Džuljeta Tamsone (born 22 July 1997) is a Latvian footballer who plays as a defender. She has been a member of the Latvia women's national team.

References

1997 births
Living people
Latvian women's footballers
Women's association football defenders
FK Liepājas Metalurgs (women) players
Latvia women's youth international footballers
Latvia women's international footballers